"It's Supposed to be Thicker than Water" is the twenty-second episode of the 1969 ITC British television series Randall and Hopkirk (Deceased) starring Mike Pratt, Kenneth Cope and Annette Andre. The episode was first broadcast on 13 February 1970 on the ITV. It was directed by Leslie Norman.

Synopsis

Cast
Mike Pratt as Jeff Randall
Kenneth Cope as Marty Hopkirk
Annette Andre as Jeannie Hopkirk
Graham Armitage ....  Young Stage Director
Felix Aylmer ....  Joshua Crackan
Dick Bentley ....  Mesmero
Meredith Edwards ....  Hodder
Liz Fraser ....  Fay Crackan
Earl Green ....  Ramon
John Hallam ....  Johnny Crackan
Neil McCallum ....  Rev. Henry Crackan
Michael Ripper ....  Punter
John A. Tinn ....  Sung Lee Crackan

Production
Although the 22nd episode in the series, It's Supposed to be Thicker than Water was the 8th episode to be shot, filmed between September and October 1968.

References

External links

Episode overview at Randallandhopkirk.org.uk
Filming locations at Randallandhopkirk.org.uk

Randall and Hopkirk (Deceased) episodes
1970 British television episodes